Ffair Fach Railway Cutting and River Section is a cut in Wales that exposes the geology and fossils of the region. It is a Site of Special Scientific Interest in Carmarthen & Dinefwr,  Wales.

See also
List of Sites of Special Scientific Interest in Carmarthen & Dinefwr

References

Sites of Special Scientific Interest in Carmarthen & Dinefwr